The American Society of Mechanical Engineers (ASME) established The Edwin F. Church Medal in 1972. Every year it is awarded to "an individual who has rendered eminent service in increasing the value, importance and attractiveness of mechanical engineering education." The ASME intends the Medal to represent Education in a very broad sense: This includes any aspect of mechanical engineering communicate via universities, technical institutes, professional society educational activities, continuing education programs of professional societies and private groups, in-house professional development programs of industrial concerns and governmental agencies, programmed learning and self-instruction systems. This means the nominees need not be professional educators.

A bequest from Edwin F. Church, Jr. (1879–1964), an ASME Member and professor of mechanical engineering and head of the department at the Polytechnic Institute of Brooklyn established the Medal.

Recipients of the Edwin F. Church Medal
Source: ASME
 
 1973.	Wilbur R. Leopold
 1974.	Hobart A. Weaver
 1975.	Harry Conn 	
 1976.	Frank W. Von Flue
 1977. not awarded
 1978. not awarded
 1979.	Kenneth A. Roe 	
 1980.	Dennis K. Bushnell
 1981.	Neal P. Jeffries
 1982.	Clinton H. Britt
 1983. not awarded
 1984.	Milo Price
 1985.	Emil L. Martinec
 1986. not awarded
 1987.	Garland H. Duncan
 1988.	Dale E. Klein
 1989.	Adolph T. Molin
 1990.	James R. Welty
 1991.	Joseph A. Falcon
 1992.	Stephen Juhasz
 1993.	Larry C. Oyen
 1994.	Avram Bar-Cohen
 1995. not awarded
 1996. not awarded
 1997.	Dean Kamen
 1998.	Allan D. Kraus
 1999.	Woodie C. Flowers
 2000.	John H. Lienhard
 2001.	Frank Kreith
 2002.	William S. Hammack
 2003. Devendra P. Garg
 2004.	David Lavery
 2005.	Vincent Wilczynski
 2006. not awarded
 2007. not awarded
 2008. not awarded
 2009. Wilbur J. Marner
 2010. not awarded
 2011. Ramesh K. Agarwal
 2012. Kenneth S. Ball
 2013. William M. Worek
 2014. John W. Cipolla
 2015. William J. Wepfer
 2016. Karen Thole
 2017. Francis A. Kulacki
 2018. Kendra V. Sharp 
 2019. Andreas Polycarpou
 2020. Nael Barakat

See also

 List of mechanical engineering awards

References

Awards established in 1972
Awards of the American Society of Mechanical Engineers